Waltman Walter syndrome
is characterized by accumulation of bile in the right subphrenic or subhepatic space, even when provision for drainage appears to have been adequate after a cholecystectomy.  It is named for Dr. Waltman Walters, an abdominal surgeon at the Mayo Clinic in Rochester, MN.

Symptoms and signs 
Upper abdominal or chest pain associated with tachycardia and persistently low blood pressure due to compression on IVC are cardinal signs and are mistaken for coronary thrombosis.

Diagnosis
Ultrasonography will show collection in subphrenic or subhepatic space.

Treatment
Abdominal reexploration and drainage of bile is curative.

References

Syndromes